Manucodes are birds-of-paradise in the genus Manucodia, that are medium-sized with black-glossed purple and green plumages.

The members of this genus are distributed in the lowland forests of New Guinea and nearby islands. They are monogamous and sexually monomorphic, in contrast to most birds-of-paradise.

The genus was introduced by the Dutch naturalist Pieter Boddaert in 1783 for a single species, the crinkle-collared manucode (Manucodia chalybatus). This is now the type species. The genus name is a contracted form of Manucodiata that had been used in 1760 by the French zoologist Mathurin Jacques Brisson for a group of birds-of-paradise.  The word is derived from the Old Javanese Manuk meaning "birds" and dewata meaning "of the gods".

The genus contains five species.

References

 
Bird genera